John the Conqueror, also known as High John de Conqueror, John, Jack, and many other folk variants, is a folk hero from African-American folklore. He is associated with the roots of Ipomoea purga, the John the Conqueror root or John the Conqueroo, to which magical powers are ascribed in American folklore, especially among the hoodoo tradition of folk magic. Muddy Waters mentions him as Johnny Cocheroo in the songs "Mannish Boy" and "I'm Your Hoochie Coochie Man". In "Mannish Boy", the line is "I think I'll go down/To old Kansas too/I'm gonna bring back my second cousin/That little Johnny Conqueroo" and in "I'm Your Hoochie Coochie Man", it is called "John De Conquer Blue".

Folk hero 
Sometimes, John is an African prince (son of a king of Congo), said to have ridden a giant crow called "Old Familiar." He was sold as a slave in the Americas. Despite his enslavement, his spirit was never broken. He survived in folklore as a reluctant folk hero, a sort of trickster figure, because of the tricks he played to evade those who played tricks on him. Joel Chandler Harris's Br'er Rabbit of the Uncle Remus stories is a similar archetype to that of High John the Conqueror, outdoing those who would do him in. Zora Neale Hurston wrote of his adventures ("High John de Conquer") in her folklore collection The Sanctified Church.

In one traditional John the Conqueror story told by Virginia Hamilton, and probably based on "Jean, the Soldier, and Eulalie, the Devil's Daughter", John falls in love with the Devil's daughter. The Devil sets John a number of impossible tasks: he must clear sixty acres (25 ha) of land in half a day and then sow it with corn and reap it in the other half a day. The Devil's daughter furnishes John with a magical axe and plow that get these impossible tasks done, but warns John that her father the Devil means to kill him even if he performs them. John and the Devil's daughter steal the Devil's own horses; the Devil pursues them, but they escape his clutches by shape-shifting.

In "High John De Conquer", Zora Neale Hurston reports that:

This is from Hurston's published article in American Mercury magazine in 1943. In this article, she relates a few stories about High John, enough to define him, but not an exhaustive survey of the folklore. The purpose was to present the nation with the hope-building and the power of this inspiring figure during the darkest days of World War II. The article ends with:

Plant information
The root known as High John the Conqueror or John the Conqueror root is said to be the root of Ipomoea jalapa, also known as Ipomoea purga, an Ipomoea species related to the morning glory and the sweet potato. The plant is known in some areas as bindweed or jalap root. It has a pleasant, earthy odor, but it is a strong laxative if taken internally. It is not used for this purpose in folk magic; it is instead used as one of the parts of a mojo bag. It is typically used in sexual spells of various sorts and it is also considered lucky for gambling. It is likely that the root acquired its sexual magical reputation because, when dried, it resembles the testicles of a dark-skinned man. Because of this, when it is employed as an amulet, it is important that the root used be whole and unblemished. Dried pieces and chips of the root are used in formulating oils and washes that are used in other sorts of spells.

Cecil Adams has written that John the Conqueror root is the root of St. John's wort. St. John's wort root is a thin and thread-like root while John the Conqueror root is a tuber. John the Conqueror root is carried by the user and the spell is cast by rubbing the root, which could not be done with a filamentous root.

Other herbs related to the legend 

Other roots are linked to the same body of legends.

Low John is the root of the trillium or wake-robin, Trillium grandiflorum.  It is carried on the person for assistance in family matters. It is also known as Dixie John or Southern John and additionally is the basis for a hoodoo formula called Dixie Love Oil.

"Chewing John" is galangal, Alpinia galanga, a member of the ginger family. This is chewed much as chewing tobacco is chewed, to sweeten the breath and to calm the stomach. It is said that if you spit the juice from chewing this root onto the floor of a courtroom before the judge enters, you will win your case. Other names for this root are Little John and Little John to Chew. It is called "Low John" in the Deep South.

References

General references 

 
 
 

Folklore of the Southern United States
Herbs
Hoodoo conjurors